The following is a list of Sites of Special Scientific Interest in the Skye and Lochalsh  Area of Search. For other areas, see List of SSSIs by Area of Search.

 Affric Cannich Hills
 Aird Thuirinis - Port na Long
 Airdghunail
 Allt Cracaig Coast
 Allt Geodh A Ghamna
 Allt Grillan Gorge
 An Cleireach
 Ard Hill
 Avernish
 Bagh Tharsgabhaig
 Beinn A Chapuill
 Boirearaig-Carn Dearg
 Carn A Bhealaich Mhoir
 Ceann Loch Eishort
 Coille Dalavil
 Coille Mhialairidh
 Coille Mhor
 Coille Thogabhaig
 Cosag Sallow Carr
 Cuillins
 Druim Iosal
 Eilean Chlamail - Camas nan Ceann
 Elgol Coast
 Eyre Point
 Geary Ravine
 Glen Barisdale
 Hangmans Bridge
 Kinloch and Kyleakin Hills (Monadh Chaol Acainn is Cheann Loch)
 Loch Alsh
 Loch Ashaig
 Loch Cleat
 Loch Meodal
 Meall A Mhaoil
 Mointeach nan Lochain Dubha
 Ob Lusa - Ard Nis Coast
 Raasay
 Rigg-Bile
 Roineval
 Rubh an Eireannaich
 Rubha Camas na Cailinn
 Rubha Hunish
 Sligachan
 Strath
 Talisker
 Trotternish Ridge (Storr to Quirang)
 Valtos

 
Skye and Lochalsh